Nowkhanik (also Romanized as Nowkhānīk) is a village in Raqqeh Rural District, Eresk District, Boshruyeh County, South Khorasan Province, Iran. At the 2006 census, its population was 44, in 13 families.

References 

Populated places in Boshruyeh County